The Honda-Broderick Cup is a sports award for college-level female athletes. The awards are voted on by a national panel of more than 1000 collegiate athletic directors. It was first presented by Tom Broderick, an American owner of a women's sports apparel company, in 1977, with the first award going to Lusia Harris, who played basketball at Delta State University. The Honda Corporation has presented the award since 1987. To be nominated, an athlete must have won the Honda Sports Award for her sport.

Winners are chosen in each of the 12 NCAA-sanctioned sports; three additional athletes are recognized as the Inspiration Award winner and Division II and III Athletes of the Year. All of these women are selected not only for their superior athletic skills, but also for their leadership abilities, academic excellence and eagerness to participate in community service.

Votes will be tabulated from over 900 NCAA-member schools, and the one athlete who is chosen as the outstanding Collegiate Woman Athlete of the Year will take home the Honda-Broderick Cup.

Winners

See also
 List of sports awards honoring women
 Honda Sports Award

Notes

External links
The Collegiate Women Sports Awards (sponsored by Honda) official website
Honda: The Collegiate Women Sports Awards

College sports trophies and awards in the United States
Women's sports in the United States
Sports awards honoring women
Awards established in 1977
Honda